Matthew Maddock (born December 1965) is an American politician in the Republican Party serving as a member of the Michigan House of Representatives. His district, the 44th, represents areas covering Highland Township, Milford Township, Springfield Township, White Lake Township, and part of Waterford Township. In his first term, Maddock was appointed to be the Chairman of the House Appropriations Subcommittee on Transportation, as well as Chairman of the Joint Committee on Administrative Rules. A Republican, Maddock was first elected in 2018. Prior to being elected to the 110-member Michigan House of Representatives, he was a businessman in Oakland County.

Maddock was expelled from the Republican caucus by Speaker Jason Wentworth in April 2022 for violating confidentiality rules.

Career 
On November 6, 2018, Maddock was elected to his first term.

In 2021, Maddock proposed legislation to require fact-checkers to register with the state of Michigan and fine them if they engaged in fact-checking without registration.

COVID-19
During the COVID-19 pandemic in Michigan, Maddock promoted misinformation about the virus. In October 2020, Maddock falsely claimed on Facebook that COVID-19 was less lethal than the flu. Matt Maddock routinely did not wear a face mask at the Capitol building; his wife, Michigan Republican Party co-chair Meshawn Maddock, made inaccurate claims on social media that the use of face coverings was "ineffective" and "harmful" and suggested that employers be sued over the matter.

In November 2020, Maddock introduced a resolution to impeach Democratic Governor Gretchen Whitmer over her COVID-19 orders; the resolution, introduced during a lame-duck session, did not gain the support of the Republican legislative leadership, headed by House Speaker Lee Chatfield and Senate Majority Leader Mike Shirkey.

In April 2021, Matt Maddock was one of a handful of Republican state representatives to appear at a protest opposing COVID-19 vaccine passports.

Efforts to overturn 2020 presidential election results

Maddock had promoted the false claim that the 2020 presidential election, in which Donald Trump was defeated by Joe Biden, was marred by election fraud. In November 2020, Maddock and other Trump supporters protested at the TCF Center at Detroit to disrupt the counting of votes. Maddock falsely claimed that 35,000 ballots "showed up out of nowhere" and that Democrats "were pretty much cheating in front of poll watchers."

In December 2020, Maddock and Daire Rendon joined a federal lawsuit filed by Trump supporters to overturn the election results. The suit asked for state lawmakers to certify the election results, therefore letting the Republican-led Michigan Legislature to overturn Biden's victory in the state. The judge dismissed the suit, writing that their arguments were "flat-out wrong" and "a fundamental and obvious misreading of the Constitution."

In January 2021, ahead of the counting of the electoral votes and the U.S. Capitol attack, Maddock and 11 other Michigan Republican state legislators wrote a letter to Vice President Mike Pence, urging him to refuse to count electoral votes from states won by Biden and to keep Trump in power. Responding to such calls, Pence replied in a letter to Congress, "It is my considered judgment that my oath to support and defend the Constitution constrains me from claiming unilateral authority to determine which electoral votes should be counted and which should not."

Both Maddock and his wife, Meshawn Maddock, co-chair of the Michigan Republican Party and a member of the national advisory board of Women for Trump, were present at the January 5, 2021 rallies. A video and photo of the couple speaking at that rally is no longer available on her Instagram account. Meshawn claimed she had organized 19 buses of people to attend the event. Meshawn also texted, "As a leader for Republicans in Michigan, I’m going to stand shoulder to shoulder with Americans that know voter fraud is real. Voters no longer trust the system and we want people prosecuted. Now is not the time for summer soldiers and sunshine Patriots, now is the time for brave men to do the right thing. We never stop fighting."

When the Maddocks walked to the Trump rally at The Ellipse on January 6, they said they couldn't get in and went back to their hotel. After the violent attack on the Capitol, Meshawn Maddock said that the rally was intended to be a "peaceful event"; that the people who "became a mob and broke the law should be held accountable"; and that she was "horrified by the death of the young woman and pray for the healing of our nation."

Maddock was endorsed by Donald Trump on November 11, 2021.

Electoral history

References 

Living people
Republican Party members of the Michigan House of Representatives
Protesters in or near the January 6 United States Capitol attack
21st-century American politicians
1965 births
Far-right politicians in the United States